Lists of members of the Politburo of the Communist Party of the Soviet Union include:
 Aug.–Oct. 1917
 Oct.–Dec. 1917
 6th (1917–18)
 7th (1918–19)
 8th (1919–20)
 9th (1920–21)
 10th (1921–22)
 11th Politburo (1922–1923)
 12th Politburo (1923–1924)
 13th Politburo (1924–1925)
 14th Politburo (1926–1927)
 15th Politburo (1927–1930)
 16th Politburo (1930–1934)
 17th Politburo (1934–1939)
 18th Politburo (1939–1952)
 19th Politburo (1952–1956)
 20th and 21st Politburo (1956–1961)
 22nd Politburo (1961–1966)
 23rd Politburo (1966–1971)
 24th Politburo (1971–1976)
 25th Politburo (1976–1981)
 26th Politburo (1981–1986)
 27th Politburo (1986–1990)
 28th Politburo (1990–1991)